Omar Betrouni (born 9 January 1949) is a former Algeria international football forward who played for MC Alger and USM Alger.

Playing career
Born in Algiers, Betrouni played club football for MC Alger for more than a decade, winning the Algerian league championship five times and the Algerian cup three times. He also led the league in goal-scoring once and helped MC Alger win the 1976 African Cup of Champions Clubs. He joined USM Alger in 1980 and would finish his career with the club, winning the Algerian cup once more.

Betrouni made 48 appearances for the senior Algeria national football team, including four FIFA World Cup qualifying matches. He made his debut in an African Cup of Nations qualifying match against Morocco on 10 December 1970. He also helped Algeria win the 1978 All-Africa Games title, scoring once in five matches.

In 2006, he was selected by CAF as one of the best 200 African football players of the last 50 years.

Club

References

External links

BETROUNI Omar at Sebbar.kazeo.com
Profile at Mouloudia.org

1949 births
Living people
Algerian footballers
Algeria international footballers
Algeria youth international footballers
JS El Biar players
MC Alger players
Footballers from Algiers
USM Alger players
African Games gold medalists for Algeria
African Games medalists in football
Association football forwards
Mediterranean Games gold medalists for Algeria
Mediterranean Games medalists in football
Competitors at the 1978 All-Africa Games
Competitors at the 1975 Mediterranean Games
21st-century Algerian people